Bound for Glory is a 1976 American biographical film directed by Hal Ashby and loosely adapted by Robert Getchell from Woody Guthrie's 1943 partly fictionalized autobiography Bound for Glory. The film stars David Carradine as folk singer Woody Guthrie, with Ronny Cox, Melinda Dillon, Gail Strickland, John Lehne, Ji-Tu Cumbuka and Randy Quaid. Much of the film is based on Guthrie's attempt to humanize the desperate Okie Dust Bowl refugees in California during the Great Depression.

Bound for Glory was the first motion picture in which inventor/operator Garrett Brown used his new Steadicam for filming moving scenes. Director of photography Haskell Wexler won the Academy Award for Best Cinematography at the 49th Academy Awards.

All of the main events and characters, except for Guthrie and his first wife, Mary, are entirely fictional. The film ends with Guthrie singing his most famous song, "God Blessed America for Me" (subsequently retitled "This Land Is Your Land"), on his way to New York, but, in fact, the song was composed in New York in 1940 and forgotten by him until five years later.

Plot
During the Great Depression in the 1930s, Woody Guthrie is unable to support his family as a sign painter and a local musician in Pampa, Texas, a town badly affected by the drought known as the Dust Bowl period. After hearing great things about California including from those leaving for it and being unable to find work, he joins the migration westward to supposedly greener pastures via boxcar riding and hitchhiking, leaving a note to his wife promising to send for her and their children. Woody discovers the low pay and absence of job security of California's casual labor fruit pickers and joins Ozark Bule in using music to fight for people's rights. He becomes a celebrated folk singer on radio with partners Ozark and Memphis Sue while still campaigning for his causes.

He has a romance with Pauline before bringing his wife and three children from Pampa to a comfortable home in California. Woody's refusal to conform to music business practices and his obsession with the hobo campers' causes threaten to break up his family and derail his growing music career. Finally, he goes to New York to campaign through his music.

Cast
 David Carradine as Woody Guthrie
 Ronny Cox as Ozark Bule
 Melinda Dillon as Mary / Memphis Sue
 Gail Strickland as Pauline
 Randy Quaid as Luther Johnson
 John Lehne as Locke
 Ji-Tu Cumbuka as Slim Snedeger
 Elizabeth Macey as Liz Johnson
 Susan Vaill as Gwen Guthrie
 Wendy Schaal as Mary Jo Guthrie - Woody's Sister
 Guthrie Thomas as George Guthrie, Woody's Brother

with appearances by
 Bernie Kopell as Woody's Agent
 Mary Kay Place as Sue Ann, Girl in Bar
 M. Emmet Walsh as the Trailer Driver
 Brion James as the Truck Driver at the California Border
 James Hong as the diner owner

Production
Arthur Krim of United Artists agreed to finance the film on the basis of Ashby's reputation, even before a star had signed on.

Dustin Hoffman and Jack Nicholson both turned down the role. Richard Dreyfuss was considered. Tim Buckley was going to be offered the part but died of a drug overdose. Ashby interviewed David Carradine but turned him down, in part because he felt Carradine was too tall. However over time he reconsidered. "He had the right rural look and the musicianship," said Ashby. "And he had a ‘to hell with you’ attitude."

Ashby later said Carradine's "to hell with you" attitude did cause him some problems during filming. "Once, when we were doing a scene, some migrant workers marched by. David started marching with them. By the time we found him, he was two miles away; and he had held up shooting for three hours.”

The railroad scenes were filmed on the Sierra Railroad. Ashby wanted a "big" freight train for the movie, as opposed to the shorter trains commonly used in filmmaking. The railroad assembled a train of 34 freight cars. Scenes taking place on the Texas panhandle that did not include views of a locomotive were filmed near Stockton, California, using diesel locomotives. Scenes showing locomotives utilized three steam locomotives owned by the Sierra Railroad, and were filmed in and around Oakdale, California, and the roundhouse scenes were filmed at what is now Railtown 1897 in Jamestown, California.

Reception
As of May 2021, Bound for Glory holds a rating of 83% on Rotten Tomatoes based on 23 reviews.

Film critic Roger Ebert praised the film, calling it "one of the best looking films ever made." However, Ebert claimed the beauty of the film was often achieved at the cost of the tone.

Accolades

American Film Institute
 AFI's 100 Years...100 Songs:	
 2004: "This Land Is Your Land" – Nominated

Soundtrack
The Academy Award-winning score was released internationally in 1976 by United Artists Records, in an album containing Leonard Roseman's music and Woody Guthrie's songs with David Carradine in the vocals. In 2012 it was also released as a CD by Intrada Records.

Home media
In January 2016, Bound for Glory was released in Blu-ray format, in a limited edition, by Twilight Time. In April 2022, another Blu-ray was released by Sandpiper Pictures. Both versions have English subtitles.

References

External links
 
 
 
 
 
  Hal Ashby article at Senses of Cinema
 

1976 films
American biographical films
Biographical films about singers
Biographical films about musicians
1970s English-language films
Films scored by Leonard Rosenman
Films about composers
Films based on biographies
Films directed by Hal Ashby
Films set in the 1930s
Films whose cinematographer won the Best Cinematography Academy Award
Great Depression films
Films that won the Best Original Score Academy Award
Rail transport films
1970s road movies
American road movies
United Artists films
Cultural depictions of Woody Guthrie
1970s American films
Films with screenplays by Robert Getchell